Reflections is an album by Swedish pianist Bobo Stenson recorded in 1993 and released on the ECM label.

Reception
The Allmusic review by Scott Yanow awarded the album 3 stars stating "Stenson shows more energy than one might expect to hear on an ECM date, although he also has several introspective explorations".

Track listing
All compositions by Bobo Stenson except as indicated

 "The Enlightener" - 6:55 
 "My Man's Gone Now" (George Gershwin, Ira Gershwin, Dubose Heyward) - 6:15 
 "Not" (Anders Jormin) - 4:49 
 "Dorrmattan" - 5:48 
 "Q" (Jormin) - 5:50 
 "Reflections in D" (Duke Ellington) - 5:25 
 "12 Tones Old" - 4:47 
 "Mindiatyr" - 10:21

Personnel
Bobo Stenson — piano
Anders Jormin — bass
Jon Christensen — drums

References

ECM Records albums
Bobo Stenson albums
1996 albums
Albums produced by Manfred Eicher